2015 U.S. Open may refer to:

2015 U.S. Open (golf), a major golf tournament
2015 US Open (tennis), a grand slam tennis event
2015 U.S. Open Grand Prix Gold, badminton tournament 
2015 Lamar Hunt U.S. Open Cup, a soccer tournament for U.S. teams